The Terril Mountains are located in west-central Nevada in the United States. The range is located at the northern end of the Walker River Indian Reservation where Lyon County, Mineral County, and Churchill County meet.

The small range reaches an elevation of 6,084 feet at Brown Knob. The mountains are located south of Fallon and east of Yerington. The Terril Mountains are home to at least eight different species of lizards.

References
 Biological Resources Research Center - 
Nevada Atlas & Gazetteer, 2001, pg. 43

Mountain ranges of Nevada
Mountain ranges of Lyon County, Nevada
Mountain ranges of Mineral County, Nevada
Mountain ranges of Churchill County, Nevada